Yvonne Marche Anderson (born March 8, 1990) is an American-Serbian professional basketball player who currently plays for  Reyer Venezia in the LBF and EuroCup Women. She also represents the Serbia national team. 

Born in United States, she successfully obtained citizenship and represents Serbia internationally. She was a standout basketball player at the University of Texas. She is the daughter of basketball coach Mike Anderson.

National team career 
On 11 November 2020, Anderson made a national team debut for Serbia in a 82–71 win over Lithuania at the EuroBasket Women 2021 qualification. She recorded 13 points, 4 rebounds and 7 assists in her debut.

In June 2021, she won the gold medal at the Eurobasket 2021 in Valencia with the Serbian national team.

Texas statistics

WNBA career statistics

Regular season 

|-
| style="text-align:left;"| 2022
| style="text-align:left;"| Connecticut
| 11 || 0 || 9.2 || .462 || .400 || 1.000 || 0.8 || 1.1 || 0.3 || 0.2 || 1.0 || 3.2
|-
| style="text-align:left;" | Career
| style="text-align:left;" | 1 year, 1 team
| 11 || 0 || 9.2 || .462 || .400 || 1.000 || 0.8 || 1.1 || 0.3 || 0.2 || 1.0 || 3.2

See also 
 List of Serbian WNBA players

References

External links
 Yvonne Anderson at galatasaray.org
 Yvonne Anderson at columbiamissourian.com

1990 births
Living people
Serbian women's basketball players
American women's basketball players
American emigrants to Serbia
American expatriate basketball people in Sweden
American expatriate basketball people in Serbia
American expatriate basketball people in Australia
American expatriate basketball people in Italy
American expatriate basketball people in Luxembourg
American expatriate basketball people in Turkey
American expatriate basketball people in Greece
Connecticut Sun players
European champions for Serbia
Galatasaray S.K. (women's basketball) players
Naturalized citizens of Serbia
Women's National Basketball Association players from Serbia
Olympiacos Women's Basketball players
People from Springdale, Arkansas
Point guards
Serbian expatriate basketball people in Sweden
Serbian expatriate basketball people in Australia
Serbian expatriate basketball people in Italy
Serbian expatriate basketball people in Turkey
Serbian expatriate basketball people in Greece
Serbian expatriate basketball people in the United States
Serbian people of African-American descent
Texas Longhorns women's basketball players
Basketball players at the 2020 Summer Olympics
Olympic basketball players of Serbia
Undrafted Women's National Basketball Association players